Patterson Joint Unified is a K-12 school district located in Patterson, California on the west side of Stanislaus County. It is designated as a joint district because its boundaries include portions of Stanislaus and Santa Clara counties, and it is a unified district because it has elementary and high schools.

Governance 
The district is governed by a seven-member Board of Education. Members of the board are elected directly by voters within the district, which encompasses Patterson, Westley, Grayson, and unincorporated areas of Stanislaus and Santa Clara counties. In 2013, the Board moved from at-large to trustee area elections.

The seven members of the Board of Education as of December 2015 are Michele Bays, Carlos Fierros, Alyssa Homen, James Leonard, Grace McCord, Michael McLaughlin, and Jose Reynoso. The district's current superintendent is Phillip Alfano (2012–present).

Schools 
Patterson currently operates 1 comprehensive high school, 1 continuation high school, 1 middle school, 1 K-8 school, 1 dependent charter school, 4 elementary schools, 5 state preschools, and 1 fee-based preschool.
 Apricot Valley Elementary
 Creekside Middle School
 Del Puerto High School
 Grayson Charter
 Las Palmas Elementary
 Northmead Elementary
 Patterson High School
 Rising Sun
 Walnut Grove School
 Preschool

References

External links 
 

School districts in Stanislaus County, California
School districts in California
1963 establishments in California
School districts established in 1963